The vice-chancellor of the University of Cambridge (formally known as The Right Worshipful the Vice-Chancellor) is the main administrative and academic officer of the university, and is elected by the Regent House for a term of up to seven years. Since October 2022, the acting vice-chancellor has been Anthony Freeling.

Prior to 1992, the position was part-time, the post-holder having other college and faculty duties. In fact, between 1587 and 1992 all holders were concurrently Masters of one of the university's colleges. Until the late nineteenth century, the term was generally one year, though this was extended to two years until the post became full-time in 1992.

Since 2003, the vice-chancellor has been assisted by five pro-vice-chancellors. For the year 2007–08, Alison Richard was paid "£227,000 in salary and perks." In 2017–18, Vice-Chancellor Stephen Toope earned a basic salary of £431,000, a significant increase from his predecessor's salary of £343,000.

Vice-chancellors

Full-time vice-chancellors

See also
 List of chancellors of the University of Cambridge
 List of vice-chancellors of the University of Oxford

References

External links
 Full List of Vice-Chancellors, University of Cambridge

Lists of people associated with the University of Cambridge

Cambridge
Cambridge